Derek Keating (born 11 May 1955) is an Irish Fine Gael politician who served as a Teachta Dála (TD) for the Dublin Mid-West constituency from 2011 to 2016.

Born and raised in Ballyfermot, Keating spent his early married life in Palmerstown, before moving to Lucan, where he has lived for the past 25 years. A former FÁS Community Employment Scheme supervisor at St Mary's Parish Centre, Lucan, Keating was a member of Fianna Fáil during the 1980s, but later joined the Progressive Democrats (PDs). He was a director of elections for Progressive Democrats candidate Tom Morrissey in the Castleknock local electoral area at the 1991 local elections. In 1998, following the constituency boundary revision which created the new constituency of Dublin Mid-West, he left the PDs, and in 1999 stood as an Independent candidate to South Dublin County Council for the Lucan electoral area. He was elected by just four votes over Fine Gael incumbent Peter Brady. Keating was comfortably re-elected in 2004, attracting one of the highest votes in the country.

He stood as an Independent candidate for Dublin Mid-West at the 2007 general election, but was not elected. He joined Fine Gael in 2008, and was re-elected as a Fine Gael candidate at the 2009 local elections. He was involved in controversy after taunting the Garda Representative Association's general secretary by issuing the statement: "Mr PJ Stone should put on a uniform and go and do real work and stop rabble-rousing."

During Budget debates in December 2012, Keating hit out at what he saw as a "Culture of Dependence" in Ireland, saying: "increased dependency on the State encourages a new lifestyle of welfare economy ... a woman will have a lone parent allowance, children’s allowance, rent subsidy, school grants, a medical card, fuel allowance and special payments from the community welfare officer which come under section 13 of the Social Welfare Act for exceptional payments".

Later in December 2012, Keating returned €7,571 of expenses to the Government, following a sample audit of expenses.

Keating was accused in May 2013, in a newspaper article by a school principal in Lucan, of falsely claiming credit for getting an extension to the school. His parliamentary aide, Tommy Morris, was then investigated by the Garda Síochána for taking about 3,000 copies of the Lucan Gazette (which carried the article) from local shops and dumping them. Keating said Morris acted without his knowledge or consent. Fine Gael also condemned the action.

In July 2013, a protest held outside his home by a pro-life group led to him leaving as he felt threatened by their behaviour. The protestors had shouted at him to open the door and banged on his front door and windows. He called Gardaí and provided names of people he had recognised. Gardaí said that they had been called but that no arrests were made.

He lost his seat at the 2016 general election. He attempted to get re-elected to South Dublin County Council in the 2019 local elections, but did not succeed.

References

 

1955 births
Living people
Fianna Fáil politicians
Fine Gael TDs
Independent politicians in Ireland
Local councillors in South Dublin (county)
Members of the 31st Dáil
Progressive Democrats politicians
People from Ballyfermot